Dmitry Liss (born 1960) is a Russian conductor. He is also the artistic director and chief conductor of the Ural Philharmonic Orchestra.

Biography
Born in 1960, Dmitry Liss is a graduate of the Moscow Conservatory. Upon graduation from the conservatory in 1984 he became a conductor of the Kuzbass Symphony Orchestra. In 1991 he was appointed to the position of Chief Conductor of this orchestra and at this time became the youngest chief conductor in Russia. Since 1995, Dmitry Liss has served as Artistic Director/Chief Conductor of the Ural Philharmonic Orchestra. Most recently, Liss was appointed Associate Conductor of the Russian National Orchestra (1999). In 1997–1999 he was Principal Russian Conductor of the American Russian Youth Orchestra.

Activities
He has taken part in numerous international festivals and has recorded CDs for a variety of American, Russian, Japanese, Taiwanese, Belgian and Swiss companies.

Awards
Winner of the 1st International Competition of Young Conductors Lovro von Matačić (Zagreb, 1995).
Artist Emeritus of Russia

External links
 Dmitry Liss on the web-site of the Ural Philharmonic Orchestra
 Dmitry Liss on the web-site of the Russian National Orchestra
  Productions Internationales Albert Sarfati (World Management) : Dmitry Liss
 DMITRY LISS: CONDUCTING IS SORT OF A DISEASE

1960 births
Living people
21st-century Russian conductors (music)
Russian male conductors (music)
21st-century Russian male musicians